Edwige is a feminine French given name. Notable people with the name include:

 Edwige Avice, French politician
 Edwige Belmore, French model, singer, and actress 
 Edwidge Danticat, Haitian-American novelist
 Edwige Djedjemel, Ivorian basketball player
 Edwige Fenech, Italian actress and film producer
 Edwige Feuillère, French film actress
 Edwige Gwend, Italian judoka
 Edwige Lawson-Wade, French basketball player
 Edwige Pitel, French cyclist
 Edwige-Renée Dro, Ivorian writer, translator and literary activist

See also
 Edwidge Danticat, Haitian-American author
 Hadewijch
 Hedwig (name)
 Jadwiga

French feminine given names